Hung is an American comedy-drama series created by Colette Burson and Dmitry Lipkin. It premiered on June 28, 2009 on HBO and ran for three seasons, airing its final episode on December 4, 2011, before being cancelled by HBO.

Thomas Jane stars as Ray Drecker, a down-on-his-luck high school basketball coach whose life hits a particularly rough patch. His team is on a losing streak, his parents' lake house burns down and his ex-wife Jessica (Anne Heche) is remarried. He is also charged with raising his two teenage children, fraternal twins Damon and Darby (Charlie Saxton and Sianoa Smit-McPhee). Determined to turn his luck around and make sense of his life, Ray attends a self-help seminar hosted by Floyd Gerber (Steve Hytner) where he meets up with an old one-night stand, Tanya (Jane Adams), who suggests that he uses the fact that he is very well endowed to make money. With Tanya's help, Ray begins making a career for himself as a male prostitute. With the exception of the pilot, every episode is named after a quote spoken by one of the characters.

Series overview

Episodes
In the following tables, "U.S. viewers (million)" refers to the number of Americans who viewed the episode on the night of its original broadcast.

Season 1 (2009)

Season 2 (2010)

Season 3 (2011)

Notes
  Number includes additional viewers from a midnight rebroadcast airing the same night.

References

External links
 
 

Hung episodes, List of